The Granicus Valles are a network of valleys in the Amenthes quadrangle of Mars, located at 30° north latitude and 229° west longitude.  They are 750 km long and are named after the ancient name for a river in Turkey. The system has been identified as outflow channels.

References 

Valleys and canyons on Mars
Amenthes quadrangle